Uncover may refer to:

 Uncover, EP by Swedish singer Zara Larsson
 Uncover (song), the title track

"Uncover", a song by Loona Odd Eye Circle from Max & Match
UnCover, an online database at the Colorado Alliance of Research Libraries
Uncover, a CBC produced true crime podcast
 unc0ver, an iOS jailbreak.

See also
Uncovered (disambiguation)
 Cover (disambiguation)